Kaleń may refer to the following places:
Kaleń, Piotrków County in Łódź Voivodeship (central Poland)
Kaleń, Radomsko County in Łódź Voivodeship (central Poland)
Kaleń, Gmina Rawa Mazowiecka in Łódź Voivodeship (central Poland)
Kaleń, Gmina Sadkowice in Łódź Voivodeship (central Poland)
Kaleń, Lublin Voivodeship (east Poland)
Kaleń, Gostynin County in Masovian Voivodeship (east-central Poland)
Kaleń, Grodzisk Mazowiecki County in Masovian Voivodeship (east-central Poland)
Kaleń, Przysucha County in Masovian Voivodeship (east-central Poland)
Kaleń, West Pomeranian Voivodeship (north-west Poland)